Inistioge or Innistiogue was a constituency represented in the Irish House of Commons until 1800.

History
In the Patriot Parliament of 1689 summoned by James II, Inistioge was represented with two members.

Members of Parliament
1585 David Power and Robert Archdeacon
1613–1615 William Murphy and Crihen Murphy
1634–1635 Griffen Murphy and James Dulan (or Neilan)
1639–1649 John Wandesford and Robert Loftus (Loftus died and replaced 1640 by John Fitzgerald)
1661–1666 Sir William Petty and Joseph Deane

1689–1801

Notes

References

Bibliography

Constituencies of the Parliament of Ireland (pre-1801)
Historic constituencies in County Kilkenny
1800 disestablishments in Ireland
Constituencies disestablished in 1800